Miners Basin, or simply Basin, is a ghost town in Grand County, Utah, United States. It was inhabited from 1898 to 1908.

History
Miners Basin was settled among the La Sal Mountains. Copper was discovered in the area in 1888, but a mining town was not established until 1898, when the recently established Miners Basin Mining District constructed a company town for their workers. From 1896 to 1905, Miners Basin had about 75-80 residents. Businesses included two saloons, a blacksmith shop, a hotel, and a post office. Copper production did not last very long; when it stopped, most residents moved to other towns. There were only six or seven families left by 1908. Several buildings and some of the mines remain. A hiking trail in the La Sal Mountains passes by Miners Basin.

See also

 List of ghost towns in Utah

References

Ghost towns in Grand County, Utah
Populated places established in 1898
Mining communities in Utah
Ghost towns in Utah